Ad Standards manages the complaint resolution process of the advertising self-regulation system in Australia.

It functions as secretariat for the Ad Standards Community Panel and the Ad Standards Industry Jury – the two independent bodies were established to determine consumer and competitive complaints against the advertising self-regulatory Codes.

The advertising self-regulation system is funded by a levy on advertising in Australia.

History 
Ad Standards was established in 1998 by the Advertising industry to regulate complaints about advertising in Australia. It started as the Advertising Standards Bureau (ASB) but was rebranded to Ad Standards in 2018.

Ad Standards originally only considered complaints under the Australian Association of National Advertisers (AANA) Code of Ethics. The remit of it has since expanded to administering a range of Codes and Initiatives.

In 2006 Ad Standards joined the European Advertising Standards Alliance (EASA) to ensure access to an appropriate best practice model for advertising complaint resolution. It complies absolutely with the European Advertising Standards Alliance (EASA) Best Practice Principles.

Statistics and Issues 
Ad Standards receives thousands of complaints every year. In 2015 it received more than 4000 complaints about 450 different advertisements, 70 of which were found to be in breach of advertising standards.

The most common issues which people raise in complaints are around sex, sexuality and nudity and discrimination.

The most complained about advertisement looked at by Ad Standards was Meat and Livestock Australia's 2016 Australia Day ad which received over 500 complaints.

The majority of complaints against advertisements are dismissed, with less than 100 ads each year found to breach advertising standards.

Scope 
Ad Standards considers complaints about all advertising or marketing material across all mediums in Australia.

It will accept a complaint if it falls under any of the Codes and Initiatives it administers.

It administers a range of Codes for the Australian Association of National Advertisers, including:

 The AANA Code of Ethics
 The AANA Code for Advertising and Marketing Communications to Children
 The AANA Food & Beverages Advertising and Marketing Communications Code
 The AANA Environmental Claims in Advertising & Marketing Code
 The AANA Wagering Advertising & Marketing Communications Code

Ad Standards also administers Codes for the Australian Food and Grocery Council (AFGC), including:

 AFGC Responsible Children's Marketing Initiative
 AFGC Quick Service Restaurant Initiative For Responsible Advertising And Marketing To Children

It also administers the Voluntary Code of Practice for Motor Vehicle Advertising for the Federal Chamber of Automotive Industries.

Ad Standards collects complaints for the Alcoholic Beverages Advertising Code Scheme's Responsible Alcohol Marketing Code, however adjudication under this Code is made by the ABAC Adjudication Panel.

Complaint process 
Members of the public can make complaints about any advertising in writing to Ad Standards, either through their website, by fax or post.

Once a complaint is received Ad Standards will assess the complaint and if it falls under the scope of the Codes and Initiatives the complaint will be forwarded to the Ad Standards Community Panel (Panel). for assessment. Advertisers are also given a chance to provide a response to the Panel.

The Panel is made up of 20 members of the community who have no connection to the advertising industry or interest groups. The Panel includes people from a broad range of age groups and backgrounds and is gender balanced.

The Panel meets twice a month to consider complaints. The panel will consider the complaint/s, the advertisement and the advertiser's response and make a determination based on whether the advertisement breaches any of the provisions under the Codes and Initiatives.

If a complaint against any advertisement is upheld the advertiser is asked to remove or amend the offending advertisement as soon as possible.

Copies of all determinations made by the Panel are published on the Ad Standards website.

See also
Advertising Standards Authority
Australian Classification Board
Censorship in Australia

References

External links

Consumer organisations in Australia
Mass media in Australia
Regulation in Australia
Advertising in Australia
Self-regulatory organizations of the advertising industry